George Arthur Rumbold (10 July 1911 – 12 December 1995) was an English professional footballer who made over 120 appearances in the Football League for Ipswich Town as a full back. He also played League football for Leyton Orient and Crystal Palace.

Career statistics

Honours 
Ipswich Town

 Ipswich Hospital Cup: 1947–48
 Norfolk Jubilee Cup: 1949–50

References 

English Football League players
English footballers
Association football fullbacks
People from Alton, Hampshire
1911 births
1995 deaths
Crystal Palace F.C. players
Leyton Orient F.C. players
Ipswich Town F.C. players
King's Lynn F.C. players
Whitton United F.C. players